Park Solomon (born November 11, 1999), also known by his stage name Lomon, is an Uzbek-born South Korean actor. Having debuted in 2014, he is best known for his leading roles in Sweet Revenge (2017), All of Us Are Dead (2022), and Revenge of Others (2022).

Early life and education 
Lomon was born on November 11, 1999, in Uzbekistan, to parents of Koryo-saram descent. As a child, he and his family lived in Russia and later moved to South Korea. Finishing his elementary in South Korea, Park completed his secondary studies at Apgujeong High School, located in Gangnam District, Seoul.

In an interview, he explained the meaning of his name: "I don't have a religion. I heard that my father built it with the intention that he wanted me to live wisely while reading the Bible at that time. I am working hard with the given name. I will live wisely."

Career 
Lomon made his debut in 2014 with two drama series, Bride of the Century and 4 Legendary Witches. After appearing in several other roles in the following years, he gained initial heightened attention with his lead role in Sweet Revenge in 2017.

In 2019, Lomon starred in the Chinese drama Lookism, having learned Mandarin for the role.

He made his return to the small screen after two years when he starred as Lee Su-hyeok in the Netflix zombie-themed series All of Us Are Dead in 2022. Following the international success of the series, Lomon gained a huge following of 2 million followers on Instagram in less than a week. In the same year, Park was reportedly cast as the lead male character in the Disney+ series Third Person Revenge opposite Shin Ye-eun. It will be broadcast in November.

On January 19, 2022, Lomon signed an exclusive contract with Big Smile Entertainment.

Filmography

Film

Television series

Web series

Awards and nominations

References

External links 
 
 

1999 births
Living people
21st-century South Korean male actors
South Korean male television actors
South Korean male film actors
South Korean male web series actors
Uzbekistani people of Korean descent
Koryo-saram